

A
LeRoy Andrews

C
John Cardwell
Pete Casey

F
James Finnegan

G
Jack Gray

K
Dick King
Ollie Kraehe
Walt Kreinheder

M
Ward Meese
George Meinhardt
Johnny Milton
William Murrah

S
Orville Siegfried
Eber Simpson

T
Ed Travis

W
Bub Weller
Hal Wilder
Ernie Winburn
Lee Wykoff

References
1923 St. Louis All-Stars roster

St. Louis All-Stars players
St. Louis